"That's Why (You Go Away)" is a power ballad by the Danish soft rock band Michael Learns to Rock. It was released in 1995 as the second single from their third studio album Played on Pepper. The song became one of the band's biggest international hits.

Background
"That's Why (You Go Away)" was released after the success of the album's first single, "Someday". The string arrangement of the song was released in the 2014 remastered edition of the album.

Music video
The music video for the song was released later in 1995. It was later released on Michael Learns to Rock's official YouTube account.

Track listings

Chart performance

See also
 Jascha Richter

References

External links
Martha Speaks music video

1995 songs
1995 singles
EMI Records singles
Michael Learns to Rock songs
Number-one singles in Denmark
1990s ballads
Rock ballads
Songs written by Jascha Richter
Soft rock songs